The 1975 French Grand Prix was a Formula One motor race held at Paul Ricard on 6 July 1975. It was race 9 of 14 in both the 1975 World Championship of Drivers and the 1975 International Cup for Formula One Manufacturers. It was the 53rd French Grand Prix and the third to be held at Paul Ricard.

The race was won from pole position by Austrian driver Niki Lauda, driving a Ferrari. Lauda led every lap and survived late charges from British driver James Hunt in the Hesketh-Ford and West German driver Jochen Mass in the McLaren-Ford, who finished 1.6 and 2.3 seconds behind respectively. It was Lauda's fourth win of the season, enabling him to extend his lead in the Drivers' Championship to 22 points over Brabham driver Carlos Reutemann.

Race summary

Despite suffering from flu, Niki Lauda still took pole position. Jean-Pierre Jarier brought a smile to French faces by setting Friday's quickest time. Jody Scheckter driving the new lightweight Tyrrell 007 set a record through the speed trap of 190 mph.

On the start line, Tom Pryce was left without a clutch and retired shortly afterwards. Lauda led from Scheckter, James Hunt and Jochen Mass. Clay Regazzoni had moved up to second before his engine exploded, Scheckter taking over the position before Hunt passed him on lap eight. Lauda and Hunt maintained first and second whilst Scheckter, struggling with handling issues, had to concede to Mass and Emerson Fittipaldi.

Jarier made a superb pass on him and made a brave bid to catch Fittipaldi, but rev-limiter problems caused him to fall back with erratic power. Mario Andretti and Patrick Depailler were performing brilliantly, advancing from eleventh to fifth and 19th to sixth respectively.

Alan Jones was duelling with Ronnie Peterson and Carlos Reutemann when he spun into the catch fencing. Reutemann suffered from tyre problems and lost a lap, whilst John Watson suffered excess power and took to the escape road. Vittorio Brambilla retired with a damper problem, Wilson Fittipaldi blew his engine, and Jacky Ickx, Mark Donohue and Carlos Pace all broke their driveshafts. Mass was in rapid pursuit of Hunt and Lauda – by the last lap he was only 2.4 seconds behind them. However, a superb lapping manoeuvre gave Hunt the space he needed. On the last corner, Lauda slid offline, but held on to win by 1.6 seconds.

Classification

Qualifying classification

Race classification

Championship standings after the race

Drivers' Championship standings

Constructors' Championship standings

References

French Grand Prix
French Grand Prix
1975 in French motorsport